Artur Kohutek (born 1 May 1971 in Osiek) is a Polish hurdler and soldier of the Polish Army.

He won the bronze medal at the 2002 European Championships in Munich in a time of 13.32 seconds.

His personal best time is 13.27 seconds, achieved in the quarter final heat at the 1997 World Championships in Athletics in Athens. This is the current Polish record. In addition he was able to equal the time one year later in Leverkusen.

Competition record

See also
Polish records in athletics

References

External links

1971 births
Living people
Polish male hurdlers
Polish soldiers
People from Bydgoszcz County
European Athletics Championships medalists
Sportspeople from Kuyavian-Pomeranian Voivodeship
Zawisza Bydgoszcz athletes
20th-century Polish people
21st-century Polish people